Sabin Merino Zuloaga (born 4 January 1992) is a Spanish professional footballer who plays mainly as a left winger for Liga MX club Atlético San Luis on loan from Real Zaragoza.

Club career

Athletic Bilbao
Born in Urduliz, Biscay, Basque Country, Merino graduated from Danok Bat CF's youth academy after spells at Athletic Bilbao's Lezama and American team Javanon FC. In the summer of 2011 he returned to the Lions, and made his debut as a senior with the farm team in Tercera División.

On 21 June 2013, Merino was promoted to the reserves in the Segunda División B. On 29 June 2015, after scoring a career-best 18 goals during the season as they returned to Segunda División after a 19-year absence, he was promoted to the main squad in La Liga.

Merino made his official debut with the first team on 6 August 2015, coming on as a second-half substitute for Javier Eraso in a 0–0 away draw against Inter Baku PIK in the third qualifying round of the UEFA Europa League. After the departure of Guillermo he was finally granted a place in the roster, being assigned #25.

Merino started in the 4–0 home rout of FC Barcelona in the Supercopa de España on 14 August 2015 as a left winger, providing the assist for Aritz Aduriz's second goal. He scored his first professional goal on 20 August, the first in a 3–2 Europa League playoff round loss at MŠK Žilina.

Merino scored his first goal in the Spanish top flight on 23 September 2015, in a 1–2 home defeat against Real Madrid.

Leganés
On 31 August 2018, Merino was loaned to CD Leganés in the same league for one year. The following May, after Athletic released him, he automatically joined the Madrid club on a permanent one-year deal.

Deportivo
Merino signed for Deportivo de La Coruña of Segunda División on 14 January 2020, after agreeing to a two-and-a-half-year contract. He scored four times in his first four matches with the club, surpassing previous holder Bebeto who held the distinction since 1992; this feat earned him January's Segunda División Player of the Month award.

Return to Leganés
On 17 August 2020, after Dépors relegation, Merino returned to Leganés. On 31 January 2022, he left as a free agent.

Zaragoza
On 31 January 2022, Merino joined fellow second-tier side Real Zaragoza on a three-and-a-half-year deal.

International career
Merino was never capped by Spain at any level. He did feature for the unofficial Basque Country regional team.

Honours
Athletic Bilbao
Supercopa de España: 2015

Individual
Segunda División Player of the Month: January 2020

References

External links

1992 births
Living people
People from Mungialdea
Sportspeople from Biscay
Spanish footballers
Footballers from the Basque Country (autonomous community)
Association football wingers
La Liga players
Segunda División players
Segunda División B players
Tercera División players
Danok Bat CF players
CD Basconia footballers
Bilbao Athletic footballers
Athletic Bilbao footballers
CD Leganés players
Deportivo de La Coruña players
Real Zaragoza players
Liga MX players
Atlético San Luis footballers
Basque Country international footballers
Spanish expatriate footballers
Expatriate footballers in Mexico
Spanish expatriate sportspeople in Mexico